Chris James Johnson (born August 29, 1977) is an American actor.

Life and career
Born in Stoneham, Massachusetts, Johnson had a supporting role as a young agent in XXX: State of the Union. He also played the lead in Three Blind Mice and Daydream Believer. His other film credits include Straight-Jacket, Cursed and Fifty Pills (on which he was also executive producer). He then starred in Lifetime series "Against The Wall" as Danny Mitchell, an old friend of Abby Kowalski.

Johnson has made also guest appearances in several television series. Recently, he appeared in JAG. His other television credits include Desperate Housewives, NCIS, CSI, Miss Match and The Vampire Diaries.  He also played one of the lead roles, Vince, in the UPN series South Beach. He also made an appearance in the 2011 video game L.A. Noire as Grosvenor McCaffrey, a main suspect in the case The Studio Secretary Murder.

Johnson starred in the Lifetime drama series Against the Wall in 2011. In 2013, Johnson was cast in ABC primetime soap opera Betrayal opposite Hannah Ware.

Filmography

References

External links
 

1977 births
Living people
American male television actors
People from Stoneham, Massachusetts